Microsoft workers in the United States do not have a trade union, but that is expected to change with the acquisition of Activision Blizzard, which recognizes a union in one of its subsidiaries. Microsoft USA workers have been active in opposing military/law enforcement contracts with their employer. There is a trade union in South Korea.

United States 
Microsoft does not recognize any trade unions in the United States, however in June 2022 it announced a labor neutrality agreement with the Communications Workers of America (CWA). Microsoft agreed it will not interfere nor oppose unionization efforts. This agreement would also apply to Activision Blizzard (ABK), 60 days after the finalization of Microsoft's acquisition of it. This happened around the same time ABK started bargaining with CWA, and recognized a bargaining unit of quality assurance testers from one of its subsidiaries Raven Software, the first major-studio video-game union.

Military contract 
In February 2019, hundreds of Microsoft employees protested the company's war profiteering from a $480 million contract to develop virtual reality headsets for the United States Army.

ICE contract 
100s of Microsoft employees protested their employers government contracts with U.S. Immigration and Customs Enforcement (ICE). 

GitHub (subsidiary of Microsoft) has a $200,000 contract with ICE for the use of their on-site product GitHub Enterprise Server. This contract was renewed in 2019, despite internal opposition from many GitHub employees. In an email sent to employees, later posted to the GitHub blog on October 9, 2019, CEO Nat Friedman stated "The revenue from the purchase is less than $200,000 and not financially material for our company." He announced that GitHub had pledged to donate $500,000 to "nonprofit groups supporting immigrant communities targeted by the current administration." In response, at least 150 GitHub employees signed an open letter re-stating their opposition to the contract, and denouncing alleged human rights abuses by ICE. As of November 13, 2019, five workers had resigned over the contract.

The ICE contract dispute came into focus again in June 2020 due to the company's decision to abandon "master/slave" branch terminology, spurred by the George Floyd protests and Black Lives Matter movement. Detractors of GitHub describe the branch renaming to be a form of performative activism and have urged GitHub to cancel their ICE contract instead. An open letter from members of the open source community was shared on GitHub in December 2019, demanding that the company drop its contract with ICE and provide more transparency into how they conduct business and partnerships. The letter has been signed by more than 700 people.

South Korea 
In the Summer of 2017, 370 workers (half of total workforce) of Microsoft Korea (South Korea MS) formed The Microsoft Korea Worker's Union. It is led by Lee Ok-Hyoung, and affiliated to the Korea Confederation of Trade Union.

On 24 November 2021, 90% of the union membership voted to go on strike over long working hours and a 3.5% pay increase that was rejected by the union membership.

See also 

 Google worker organizations
 IBM worker organization
 SAP employee representation

Notes

References

External links 

 Database of Microsoft collective actions

Microsoft
Microsoft culture
Labor relations in the United States
Labor in South Korea
Tech sector trade unions